Adrianne Marie Curry-Rhode (born August 6, 1982) is an American fashion model, actress and television personality. She is best known as the winner of the first cycle of America's Next Top Model in 2003.

Career

Modeling
Curry won the first cycle of America's Next Top Model. She was signed to Wilhelmina Models in New York City. She has modeled for several magazines, including Life & Style, Us Weekly, Star, OK!, Stuff, People, Maxim (and made the Maxim Hot 100 list in 2005), Spanish Marie Claire, Von Dutch, Von Dutch Watches, Salon City, Macy's, Famous Stars and Straps, Lucky, Ed Hardy, Kinis Bikinis, Beverly Hills Choppers, and Merit Diamonds. Curry's runway shows include Anne Bowen Spring 2005, Jaime Pressly, Pamela Anderson's line, Ed Hardy, Von Dutch, and Christopher Deane. She has appeared in a commercial for the Merit Diamonds Sirena Collection that ran from November 2004 to January 2006. She appeared on the cover and in a nude pictorial for the American edition Playboy in February 2006. She returned for a second cover and nude pictorial in the January 2008 issue. Curry made Playboy's 2008 top 25 sexiest women, along with the top 100 Playboy spreads 2008 edition.

Television and film

Curry was a co-host on the television game show Ballbreakers. In 2006, she appeared on Gameshow Marathon as a celebrity panelist on the Match Game episode. She starred in "Rock Me Baby" (2004) and Half & Half (2003) on UPN. Curry also appeared on Dirt starring Courteney Cox, with whom she shared scenes. She appeared in rock band's The Click Five music video "Just the Girl", along with husband Christopher Knight.  Curry appeared on VH1's celeb science fiction reality show Celebrity Paranormal Project in 2006, along with her husband, and on WE TV's From Russia with Love that documented her trip to Russia and aired November 2007. She has also starred in the films Fallen Angels, Light Years Away and "Jack Rio."

In early 2005, Curry appeared on VH1's fourth season of The Surreal Life. After the season ended, Curry and fellow house guest Knight began dating, and later moved in together. On September 11, 2005, VH1 began airing My Fair Brady, a show that documented their life together and paid her an estimated US$450,000. The show led her to being featured in Maxim's Hot 100, a list of the "hottest" women on earth and ranked #100 on the Maxim Hot 100 Women of 2005.

Season 3 of My Fair Brady began airing on January 21, 2008 and focused on Curry's breast enhancement surgery and Knight's competing (and contrary) desire to start a family. In June 2008, Curry and her family and friends appeared on NBC's Celebrity Family Feud. Between November and December 2010, Curry worked as the "Resident Celebrity Gamer" panelist judge on the second series of The Tester, a reality program on the PlayStation Network. She has returned to the panel in the third series which began on February 7, 2012. Curry  hosted live coverage of Blizzcon for Direct TV in 2011, as well as Hosting live from E3 for Namco Bandai in both 2011 and 2012.

Personal life

She married Christopher Knight in May 2006, after meeting on The Surreal Life and having their relationship documented on My Fair Brady. In 2011 the couple announced their separation and filed for divorce.

Curry announced her engagement to movie trailer-voice actor Matthew Rhode on August 5, 2017. Curry left Hollywood for good to pursue a "normal rural" life. Curry now runs her own lifestyle blog from her remote location. She and Rhode moved to Whitefish, Montana. They eloped in Glacier National Park in Montana on September 15, 2018.

She is of Italian descent through her maternal grandmother.

Curry was raised as a Roman Catholic, but later identified as an atheist during her marriage to Christopher Knight after they had debates over religion. As of October 2020, Curry has professed her belief in God and, although remaining irreligious, stated, "I will always have a place in my heart for the Catholic Faith and their lovely Cathedrals."

Filmography

References

External links

 
 

1982 births
Actresses from Illinois
American people of Italian descent
America's Next Top Model winners
Female models from Illinois
Living people
People from Joliet, Illinois
21st-century American women